Qadesh, Qedesh, Qetesh, Kadesh, Kedesh, Kadeš and Qades come from the common Semitic root "Q-D-Š", which means "sacred."

Kadesh and variations may refer to:

Ancient/biblical places
 Kadesh (Syria) or Qadesh, an ancient city of the Levant, on or near the headwaters or a ford of the Orontes River
 Tell al-Nabi Mando, also called Qadesh and adjacent to the ancient site
 Battle of Qadesh, a battle between the forces of the Egyptian Empire under Ramesses II and the Hittite Empire under Muwatalli II  
 Kadesh (biblical) or Qadesh, biblical site or sites, one of which is sometimes named as Kadesh Barnea
 Kedesh, also Kedesh Naphthali, an ancient city in Upper Galilee, Israel (see also Qadas)

Modern places
 Kadesh Barnea, also known as Nitzanei Sinai, a modern community settlement in the Negev desert of Israel
 Qadas, a Palestinian Arab Shiite village northeast of Safad that was depopulated during the 1948 Arab-Israeli war (see also Kedesh)
 Kidosht or Kadāsh, a village in Momenabad Rural District, in the Central District of Sarbisheh County, South Khorasan Province, Iran
 Qades, a village in Badghis Province in north western Afghanistan

Other uses
 Qetesh, a Canaanite and Egyptian fertility goddess
 Qetesh (Stargate), a character in the Stargate fictional universe
 Kadosh, a 1999 film by Amos Gitai
 Qadesh, the male equivalent of Qedesha, a sacred or temple prostitute
 Qadesh, a military unit in the Syrian Civil War that fights under the command of the Republican Guard.

See also 
 Kaddish (disambiguation)